Materum, Nigeria is a city located in the Karim Lamido Local Government Area in Taraba State region of Nigeria, Africa. Materum has a river that runs straight through the city itself.

References
Satellite view of the city
Materum info page on maplandia.com

Populated places in Taraba State